The English National Cross Country Championships is an annual English cross country running event which takes place in late February following the regional championships (Southern, Midlands and Northern) which all take place on the same weekend usually in late January. The event is the oldest national cross country championship in the world, having been first run in 1876. The English, Welsh and Scottish National Cross Country Championships are all usually held on the same day.

Format
There are categories for senior men and women, junior men and women, U17, U15, U13 and club teams. The course is 12 km for men and 8 km for women and the fact that the distances for senior men and senior women is different has recently been a topic for discussion and review. Following a review of various surveys the English Cross Country Association voted to keep the race distances at 12 km for the senior men and 8 km for the senior women for the 2019 championship.

The event is organised by the English Cross Country Association and currently sponsored by Saucony UK. As well as individual competition, senior athletes represent their athletics club for points scoring and team awards.  Club teams consist of six senior men or four senior women.

Venues
The venue for the English National Cross Country Championships is not fixed and is usually hosted in turn by the regional associations. The men's and women's venues were held at different locations until 1995, when both were held at the same venue for the first time.

History
The first championship in 1876 was known as the 'National' and was declared void because all 32 runners went off course. The women's event was first held in 1927. The senior event winners are shown in the table. Up to 1994, the women's event was run separately at a different location from the men's race.

Winners

Notes

References

External links
Official Site
UK Athletics
England Athletics

Athletics competitions in England
Cross country running competitions
Athletics team events
Recurring sporting events established in 1876
1876 establishments in England
Cross Country
Cross country running in the United Kingdom
National cross country running competitions